Mal-e Akhund (also Romanized as Māl-e Ākhūnd, Mal Akhoond, and Māl-e Ākhvond; also known as Māl-i-Akhūn) is a village in Tayebi-ye Garmsiri-ye Shomali Rural District, in the Central District of Landeh County, Kohgiluyeh and Boyer-Ahmad Province, Iran. At the 2006 census, its population was 55, in 11 families.

References 

Populated places in Landeh County